Crystal Smith, better known by her stage name Dimples D., is an American rapper who became a one-hit wonder in 1990.

Sucker DJ
Dimples D. was selected as the vocalist for a track by hip hop producer Marley Marl entitled "Sucker DJ's (I Will Survive)", released on Party Time Records in 1983. "Sucker D.J.'s" was written by Crystal Smith / Williams / Kaye / Montenegro.

The song—an answer song to Run–D.M.C.'s "Sucker M.C.s (Krush-Groove 1)"—did not sell in quantity upon its first release, but Ben Liebrand reworked the song in 1990, including a sample of the theme song from the American sitcom I Dream of Jeannie. Upon re-release, the song went to #1 in Australia, #17 in the UK Singles Chart, and charted in many countries in Europe.

Discography

Albums

Singles

References
Notes

External links
[ Dimples D.] at Allmusic

American women rappers
African-American women rappers
Living people
Place of birth missing (living people)
Year of birth missing (living people)
21st-century American rappers
21st-century American women musicians
21st-century African-American women
21st-century African-American musicians
21st-century women rappers